The Petit lac Saint-François (in English: Little Lake Saint François) is a lake located near the municipality of Saint-Joseph-de-Coleraine in the administrative region of Chaudière-Appalaches, in Quebec, in Canada. It receives the waters of the Ashberham River which has its source in Caribou Lake. The discharge of the lake joins the Grand lac Saint François, source of the Saint-François River which joins the Saint Lawrence River.

Geography 

The route 112 gives access to the lake. The Bécancour Trail (Abenaki Becancour Trail), passed by there, linked the Bécancour River and the basin of the Saint-François river.

References 

Lakes of Chaudière-Appalaches
Les Appalaches Regional County Municipality